Black Beauty is a 1978 animated television film produced by the Australian division of Hanna-Barbera and based on the 1877 novel of the same name by Anna Sewell. It originally aired October 28, 1978 as part of Famous Classic Tales on CBS.

The special was released on VHS by Worldvision Home Video (now CBS Home Entertainment) in 1983 and re-released through Goodtimes Home Video under the Kids Klassics Home Video label in 1987 and was released on DVD by Koch Vision.

Voices
Catherine Cordell – Duchess
Alan Dinehart –
Mike Evans –
David Gregory –
Barbara Stevens –
Alan Young – Narrator / Black Beauty / Nicholas Skinner
Cam Young –
Laurie Main – Farmer Grey / Squire Douglas Gordon / Pipe Smoking Stable Owner
Colin Hamilton –
Patricia Sigris –
David Comford –

References

External links
 

1978 television films
1978 films
1978 in American television
1970s American animated films
1970s American television specials
1970s animated television specials
Hanna-Barbera animated films
Hanna-Barbera television specials
Films based on Black Beauty